Egyptian-Swiss relations are the bilateral relations  between Egypt and Switzerland.  Official diplomatic relation between both countries date back from 1909, with the opening of a Swiss trade mission in Egypt.  Egypt has an embassy in Berne and a general consulate in Geneva.  Switzerland has an embassy in Cairo.

Luxor massacre    
  

On November 17, 1997, 36 Swiss tourists were killed in Luxor, Egypt, during the Luxor massacre. The attack was perpetrated by Al-Gama'a al-Islamiyya.

See also 
 Foreign relations of Egypt
 Foreign relations of Switzerland

External links 
 Egyptian embassy in Bern
 Swiss Federal Department of Foreign Affairs about relations with Egypt